Llangefni Urban District was established under the Local Government Act 1894 and abolished in 1974.

Some details here

References

Urban districts of Wales
History of Anglesey